A-796,260 is a drug developed by Abbott Laboratories that acts as a potent and selective cannabinoid CB2 receptor agonist. Replacing the aromatic 3-benzoyl or 3-naphthoyl group found in most indole derived cannabinoids with the 3-tetramethylcyclopropylmethanone group, imparts significant selectivity for CB2, and A-796,260 was found to be a highly selective CB2 agonist with little affinity for CB1, having a CB2 Ki of 4.6 nM vs 945 nM at CB1. It has potent analgesic and anti-inflammatory actions in animal models, being especially effective in models of neuropathic pain, but without producing cannabis-like behavioral effects.

Legal Status

As of October 2015 A-796,260 is a controlled substance in China.

See also 
 A-834,735
 A-836,339
 BMS-F
 JWH-200
 UR-144
 XLR-11

References 

Cannabinoids
Cyclopropanes
Aminoalkylindoles
Tetramethylcyclopropanoylindoles